The 1911 Geneva Covenanters football team was an American football team that represented Geneva College as an independent during the 1911 college football season. Led by Arthur McKean in his fifth and final year as head coach, the team compiled a record of 1–6–1.

Schedule

References

Geneva
Geneva Golden Tornadoes football seasons
Geneva Covenanters football